The Rajya Sabha (meaning the "Council of States") is the upper house of the Parliament of India. Telangana elects 7 seats and they are indirectly elected by the state legislators of Telangana. The number of seats allocated to the party, are determined by the number of seats a party possesses during nomination and the party nominates a member to be voted on. After the Bifurcation of Andhra Pradesh, members were allotted to Telangana state for the first time by lucky draw.

Current Members

Members Bifurcated From Andhra Pradesh
Before the bifurcation of states, the combined state of Andhra Pradesh used to represent 18 seats to Rajya Sabha. Post bifurcation, Andhra Pradesh seats were changed to 11 and Telangana has had 7 seats since then. On 30 May 2014, draw was conducted amongst the existing 18 members to select the 7 members of Telangana. In the draw, 3 members of Telugu Desam Party (TDP) and 4 members of Indian National Congress (INC) were selected.

References

External links
Rajya Sabha homepage hosted by the Indian government
Nominated members list
State wise list

Telangana
 
Telangana-related lists

bg:Раджа Сабха
cy:Rajya Sabha
de:Rajya Sabha
fr:Rajya Sabha
gu:રાજ્ય સભા
ko:라자 사바
it:Rajya Sabha
ml:രാജ്യസഭ
mr:राज्यसभा
nl:Rajya Sabha
ja:ラージヤ・サバー
pl:Rajya Sabha
pt:Rajya Sabha
sv:Rajya Sabha
te:రాజ్యసభ